Melville is a small city in the east-central portion of Saskatchewan, Canada. Melville is bordered by the rural municipalities of Cana No. 214 and Stanley No. 215. Its population at the 2016 census was 4,562, making it Saskatchewan's smallest city. It is also home of hockey's Melville Millionaires, who compete in the Saskatchewan Junior Hockey League, and baseball's Melville Millionaires, who compete in the Western Canadian Baseball League.

History
According to What's in a Name?: The Story Behind Saskatchewan Places and Names by E. T. Russell, and People Places: Contemporary Saskatchewan Place Names by Bill Barry, the city was named for Charles Melville Hays, who at the time of the settlement's initial construction was the president of the Grand Trunk Railway and Grand Trunk Pacific Railway. Hays was on board the RMS Titanic when it sank; he did not make it off the ship.

Pearl Park was the area's first post office established in 1905 near the Pearl Creek, a tributary of the Qu'Appelle River. Melville was declared a city by the province in 1960.

Demographics 

Government
The mayor of Melville is Dr. Walter Streelasky.

Provincially, Melville is within the constituency of Melville-Saltcoats. It is currently represented by Saskatchewan Party MLA Warren Kaeding.

Melville is represented in the House of Commons of Canada by the MP of the Yorkton—Melville riding, currently Cathay Wagantall of the Conservative Party of Canada.

Infrastructure

Melville's namesake was the president of the Grand Trunk Railway and Grand Trunk Pacific Railway, Charles Melville Hays.  Since Melville's founding in 1908, it has served as a nexus for railroad activity, currently including that of Canadian National Railway and Via Rail, the latter for which Melville effectively serves as the main rail-to-bus connection to Regina for its passengers. Today, the transcontinental Canadian train, operated by national passenger rail carrier Via Rail, serves the Melville railway station three times per week.

In 2002 the St. Peter's Hospital was constructed. St. Peter's was founded in 1940 as a municipal hospital by the Sisters of St. Martha, based in Antigonish, Nova Scotia. Next to St. Peter's is the St. Paul Lutheran Home.

The Melville Railway Museum (c. 1911) is a Municipal Heritage Property on the Canadian Register of Historic Places.

The Melville Heritage Museum is in the original Luther College (formerly Luther Academy) building, built in 1913. The Luther Academy moved to Regina in 1926. After a stint as St. Paul's Home for the Aged and Orphans, the building was declared a heritage site, opening as a museum in the early 1980s.

Melville's connections by road to other communities include Saskatchewan Highways 10, 15 and 47. The closest major centre to Melville is the city of Yorkton, 43 kilometres to the northeast.

Education
Melville is served by public and Catholic schools: École St. Henry's Junior Elementary School, and St. Henry's Sr School are both part of the Christ the Teacher Catholic School Division  The Carlton Regional College Basic Education is located nearby in Lestock.  Davison School, as part of the Good Spirit School Division offers pre-kindergarten to grade 6 education. The Melville Comprehensive School, a part of the Good Spirit School Division provides secondary education. Parkland Regional College provides post secondary technical training and operates a campus out of the Melville Comprehensive High School building.
Parkland College operates its NFPA fire training field near the Melville Municipal Airport.

Sports 

Melville is home to the Melville Millionaires of the Saskatchewan Junior Hockey League, as well as the Melville Millionaires of the Western Canadian Baseball League.

In 2011 the Melville Communiplex opened. The federal and provincial governments covered $20 million of the construction costs of the $24.5 million facility.  The Communiplex has an NHL size ice surface and seating capacity for 1,500 people, a walking track, fitness and cardio care facilities, and a convention centre. It replaces the existing 60-year-old Melville Stadium, home to the Melville Millionaires.

The city also has an 18-hole golf course.

Media
Newspaper
The Melville Advance, a weekly paper.

Radio

Melville currently has no current FM or AM radio stations, instead they are serviced by a digital radio station called: The Buzz (www.TheBuzzRocks.ca) and coming soon, The Axe- Melville's newer Alternative Music:

Television
CICC-TV Yorkton channel 10, CTV, SNN

Recreation
Within  are the Melville Game Preserve, Melville Regional Park, Melville Reservoir, and Duff Recreation Site.

Popular culture
In the film Hannibal Rising (2007), title character Hannibal Lecter shows up in the "hamlet of Melville" in the final scene. However the town depicted is surrounded by forest and is referred to as "near Saskatoon".

Notable residents 
 George Abel - Olympic Gold Medalist (deceased)
 Sid Abel - Hockey Hall of Famer (deceased)
 Phil Bessler - Former NHL player for the Detroit Red Wings
 Evan Carlson - Former Saskatchewan MLA
 Tim Cheveldae - NHL Goaltender for the Winnipeg Jets, and Detroit Red Wings
 Jimmy Franks - Former NHL Goaltender for the Detroit Red Wings
 Shaun Heshka - NHL player for the Phoenix Coyotes
 Sol Kanee - President of the Canadian Jewish Congress from 1971 to 1974
 Chris Kunitz - NHL player for the Pittsburgh Penguins
 Todd McLellan - Head coach of the NHL's Los Angeles Kings
 Mike Morin - Former professional ice hockey player
 Alex Motter - Former NHL player for the Detroit Red Wings
 Terry Puhl - Retired MLB player for the Houston Astros
 Roger Reinson - Retired CFL player, 3-time Grey Cup Champion
 Damon Severson - NHL player for the New Jersey Devils
 Jarret Stoll - NHL player for the Columbus Blue Jackets
 Arch Wilder - Former NHL player for the Detroit Red Wings
 Mike Woloschuk - Former curler at men's world championships and two time gold medalist at Pacific-Asia Curling Championships
 Lyall Woznesensky - Former CFL defensive lineman

Gallery

Location

References

External links

 
Cities in Saskatchewan
Populated places established in 1908
1908 establishments in Saskatchewan
Division No. 5, Saskatchewan